Hamilton College is a co-educational Christian private school located in Hamilton, South Lanarkshire, Scotland. It provides education from Nursery age (2 years and up) through the full 7 years of primary education and 6 years of secondary school (up to 18 years old). The Nursery, Junior and Senior Schools pupils are on the same campus and in the same building. The Headteacher is Richard Charman.

Although it is a Christian school, there is no church affiliation, and the school has pupils from other cultural backgrounds.

History
Hamilton College was opened in 1983 by Charles Oxley. The Nursery opened on the same campus in 1995. The building had originally opened as a teacher training college in 1964. Hamilton College was the third school Oxley opened. He had already founded Tower College (1948) and Scarisbrick Hall School (1964) in North-West England.

The school badge is inspired by the scripture "to grow in the grace and knowledge of our Lord and Saviour Jesus Christ". This verse from 2Peter 3:18 provided the original inspiration for the College’s Growing Together theme.

In July 2016, Tom McPhail was appointed as acting principal, replacing John Taylor.

After Tom McPhail retired in December 2019, Katie Morton was appointed Chief Executive officer, with Richard Charman as Headteacher.

Curriculum
All S1 and S2 pupils at the school study Latin, and have the option to continue this.

The college has high academic standards. In 2019 it had a 93% pass rate at SQA Higher, with a 100% pass rate in many subjects, including mathematics. In 2020, the pass rate increased to 95%.

Notable former pupils

Scott Forrest, retired professional rugby player and current coach of women's rugby
Katie Leung, actress

References

External links
 
 inspection reports on Education Scotland website
 profile on Scottish Council of Independent Schools website

Private schools in South Lanarkshire
Christian schools in Scotland
Educational institutions established in 1983
Buildings and structures in Hamilton, South Lanarkshire
1983 establishments in Scotland